Carlo Azzini (19 July 1935 – 12 January 2020) was an Italian racing cyclist. He rode in the 1962 Tour de France.

References

External links
 

1935 births
2020 deaths
Italian male cyclists
Place of birth missing
Cyclists from the Province of Cremona